He Ain't Heavy may refer to:

Television

American television
 "He Ain't Heavy", an episode of She-Ra: Princess of Power
 "He Ain't Heavy", an episode of The New Adventures of Old Christine
 "He Ain't Heavy", a segment of an episode of The Love Boat

British television
 "He Ain't Heavy", an episode of Custer's Last Stand-up
 "He Ain't Heavy", an episode of Doctors (2000 TV series)

International television
 "He Ain't Heavy...", an episode of the Canadian series Degrassi Junior High
 "He Ain't Heavy", an episode of the Australian series Head Start (TV series)

Art

A painting by Cincinnati artist Gilbert Young, widely popular amongst African-Americans with approximately one million reproductions sold

See also 
 She Ain't Heavy (disambiguation)
 He's Not Heavy (disambiguation)
 He Ain't Heavy, He's My Brother (disambiguation)